Fools Rush In may refer to:

 Fools Rush In (1949 film), a British comedy
 Fools Rush In (1973 film), a British TV documentary
 Fools Rush In (1997 film), an American romantic comedy
 Fools Rush In (play), a 1946 play by Kenneth Horne
 "Fools Rush In (Where Angels Fear to Tread)", a 1940 popular song written by Johnny Mercer and Rube Bloom, covered by many artists
 "Fools Rush In", an episode of All Grown Up!
  "Can't Help Falling In Love" (1961 album),Blue Hawai, Elvis Presley

See also
 Fools rush in where angels fear to tread, a line from the poem An Essay on Criticism by Alexander Pope